Hew or HEW may refer to:
 Hew, a given name
 Hewer, a type of miner
 Hewing, the creation of lumber from logs
 Hanford Engineer Works, part of the Manhattan Project
 Health extension worker
 Heworth Interchange, in Tyne and Wear, England
 United States Department of Health, Education, and Welfare, renamed to the Department of Health and Human Services following the establishment of the Department of Education

See also 
Hews (disambiguation)
Hue (disambiguation)
 Hugh (disambiguation)
 HUW (disambiguation)